Alexandra Prince (born 1975) is a German singer and songwriter.

Career 
Prince's early career started in Germany with the Booya Family, for which she sang many top hits and also Nana's Number 1 Hit "Lonely". Her first solo single "How we livin was a top 30 hit and stayed in the German Charts for 16 weeks.

Since the song "So many Times" by Gadjo feat. Alexandra Prince became a club hit in 2005, Alexandra earned a place as a house diva. The song reached number 22 in the official UK Single Charts.

Discography 
 Nana / Lonely (vocals, 1997)
 Nana / He's Comin' (vocals, 1997)
 Nana feat. Alex Prince / One Second (vocals, 1997)
 Alex Prince feat. Mazaya / How We Livin' (vocals, 1998)
 Alex Prince / Whatever (vocals, 1999)
 Madelyne / Beautiful Child (vocals, 2001)
 Laava / Wherever You Are (I Feel Love) (vocals, 2002)
 New Tone / Waiting for Your Love (vocals, co-writer, 2002)
 Gadjo / Besame Mucho (vocals, 2002)
 DJs@Work / Time 2 Wonder (vocals, 2002)
 Neo Cortex / Elements (vocals, 2002, remixed 2004)
 Neo Cortex / Don't You (vocals, 2003)
 DJs@Work / Past Was Yesterday (vocals, 2003)
 DJs@Work / Some Years Ago (vocals, 2003)
 No Angels / Angel of Mine (co-writer, 2003)
 Vanessa S. / Shining (co-writer, 2003)
 Nalin & Kane vs. Denis the Manace feat. Alexandra Prince / Cruising (vocals, 2003)
 Phantom Black feat. Alexandra Prince / I Have Nobody (Deichkind Remix) (vocals, 2003)
 Phantom Black feat. Alexandra Prince / My Love (vocals, co-writer, 2003)
 Gadjo feat. Alexandra Prince / So Many Times (vocals & co-writer, 2005)
 Fettes Brot feat. Alexandra Prince / Kuba (vocals, 2005)
 Neo Cortex / Storm of Light (vocals, 2005)
 Neo Cortex / I Want You! (vocals, 2006)
 Fireflies feat. Alexandra Prince / I Can't Get Enough (vocals & co-writer, 2006)
 Locktown feat. Alexandra Prince / Alive (vocals & co-writer, 2006)
 Neo Cortex / Hold Me Tonight (vocals, 2007)
 Giulia Siegel / Dance! (vocals, 2007)
 Alexandra Prince / Rising high (vocals, 2007)
 Syke'n'Sugarstarr feat. Alexandra Prince / Are You (Watching me, Watching you) (vocals & co-writer, 2006)
 Syke'n'Sugarstarr feat. Alexandra Prince / So Alive (vocals & co-writer, 2010)
 Kool Savas / 30 Sekunden feat. Olli Banjo and Mo-Trip (John Bello Story 3, 2010)
 Kool Savas feat. Alexandra Prince / Limit (Märtyrer, 2014)
 Neo Cortex / Elements 2k15 (vocals, 2015)
 Ben Delay feat. Alexandra Prince / The Boy Is Mine (vocals, 2016)
 Mark Lower feat. Alexandra Prince / Always on My Mind (vocals, 2016)
 Ben Delay feat. Alexandra Prince / Out of My Life (vocals, 2017)

References

External links
 Official Website of Alexandra Prince

1975 births
Living people
Musicians from Hamburg
German house musicians
German dance musicians
Women in electronic music